The Ochlockonee River is a fast running river, except where it has been dammed to form Lake Talquin in Florida, originating in Georgia and flowing for  before terminating in Florida.

Background 
The name is from the Hitchiti language words for yellow river. The Ochlockonee originates south of the town of Sylvester in Worth County in southwest Georgia and empties into Ochlockonee Bay and then Apalachee Bay in Florida.

The river forms the western boundaries of Leon County and Wakulla County and eastern boundaries of Gadsden County, Liberty County, and Franklin County in Florida.

History 

When the Spanish arrived in northern Florida, the Ochlockonee River formed the western boundary of their Apalachee Province. Late 17th-century Spanish documents refer to the river as Claraquachine and Amarillo (Spanish for "yellow"). A 1716 Spanish document called it Rio de Lagna (lagna is probably Apalachee for "yellow"). An English map from 1720 identifies it as the Yellow River. A 1778 map spells the river's name "Okalockney", while one from 1856 has it as "Oklokonee". The modern name probably derives from the Hitchiti/Mikasuki Oki (water) and Lagana (yellow).

From 1839 to 1842, Fort Virginia Braden was established on the river located at Fort Braden in Florida. The fort was named after the commander's wife who died of yellow fever.

The Civil War
The Ochlockonee River saw action during the Civil War. On 15 July 1863, the screw steamer gunboat USS Stars and Stripes and wooden side-wheel steam ferryboat USS Somerset attacked the salt works at Mashes Sands. On 29 December 1863, Stars and Stripes sank the blockade-running schooner Caroline Gertrude, aground on the sandbar at the mouth of the Ochlockonee. Stars and Stripes also captured the blockade-running steamer Laura off the Ochlockonee on 18 January 1864. On 19 and 20 October 1864, Stars and Stripes destroyed an extensive Confederate fishery at Mashes Island and captured the troops stationed there as guards.

Jackson Bluff Dam

In 1927 the Jackson Bluff Dam was constructed on the Ochlockonee River to produce hydroelectric power. The waters held back by the dam formed Lake Talquin.

Importance 

The Ochlockonee River corridor is home to many threatened fish, wildlife and plant species. It has been designated under the State of Florida's Outstanding Florida Waters program and has been identified by the Florida Fish and Wildlife Conservation Commission as a Strategic Habitat Conservation Area.

Rare animals that can be found along the Ochlockonee include red-cockaded woodpecker, least tern, and the Apalachicola dusky salamander. The river is especially rich in rare freshwater mussels (Unionidae), including three federally listed endangered species: the Ochlockonee moccasinshell, the Shinyrayed pocketbook, and the Oval pigtoe. "The Florida maybell tree can be found only along the Ochlockonee and Chipola Rivers.

The Ochlockonee is connected to and a source of water for Lake Iamonia, especially during flooding.

Recreation 
Fishing for largemouth bass, black crappie, Bream, striped bass and catfish can be excellent on the Ochlockonee River, and a state-designated canoe trail can be found both upstream and downstream of Lake Talquin. Telogia Creek and the Little River near State Road 12 are also popular for canoeing. The Florida National Scenic Trail follows the river for two miles.

The Ochlockonee is a vital link in the production of seafood in Apalachee Bay. During floods, the river transports organic matter downstream into the estuary of Ochlockonee Bay where the shallows of the bay were created by the great volume of sand and clay brought down by the river. This estuary serves as a nursery for numerous species of fish and shellfish which are the basis for recreational and commercial fishing as well as the seafood that this area is known for. Fishing on the Ochlockonee Bay is excellent for Flounder, Redfish, Black Drum, Spotted Sea Trout, Blue Crab and sharks.

Crossings
A number of major highways cross the Ochlockonee River along its course, including Interstate 10 and U.S. highways 19, 27, U.S. Route 84 and 319.

See also
 South Atlantic-Gulf Water Resource Region

Notes

References

External links
 Ochlockonee River and Bay profile and documents from the Northwest Florida Water Management District
 

American Heritage Rivers
Rivers of Florida
Rivers of Georgia (U.S. state)
Rivers of Franklin County, Florida
Bodies of water of Leon County, Florida
Rivers of Wakulla County, Florida
Bodies of water of Gadsden County, Florida
Bodies of water of Liberty County, Florida
Rivers of Grady County, Georgia
Rivers of Thomas County, Georgia
Rivers of Colquitt County, Georgia
Rivers of Worth County, Georgia